Antilles Air Boats was a commuter airline founded by Charles F. Blair Jr. in 1963. It was based in the US Virgin Islands.

History 
Antilles Air Boats was founded in 1963, and provided transport between St Thomas and St Croix in the US Virgin Islands as well as San Juan, Puerto Rico. Antilles Air Boats built up its fleet until it operated 27 aircraft, all propeller driven float planes from World War II which were well suited to the short hops over water the airline specialized in. In 1974 the airline purchased two Sandringham flying boats from Ansett Flying Boat Services. In 1967 the airline also acquired the last Sikorsky VS-44 "Excambian" that they operated until it was damaged in 1969. 

On 2 September 1978 company president Charles F. Blair Jr was killed in a crash while piloting Antilles Air Boats Flight 941, the flight was carrying 10 passengers. His then-wife, actress Maureen O'Hara took over management of the company, becoming the first woman to become president of United States-based airline. 

On March 22 1977 American Airlines founded American Inter-Island Airlines and contracted Antilles Air Boats to pilot and operate their fleet of Convair 440s. In 1981 the airline was sold to Air Resorts.

Destinations 
This is a list of Antilles Air Boats destinations throughout its existence: 
Fajardo
Saint Croix
Saint John
Saint Peter
Saint Thomas
San Juan
Tortola

Fleet 

The fleet of Antilles Air Boats consisted of:

 Grumman G-21 Goose
Grumman G-73 Mallard 
 Short Sandringham
 Sikorsky VS-44

Accidents and Incidents 

 Nov 5, 1978: A Grumman G-21A Goose was damaged beyond repair, when on a test flight on behalf of the FAA the aircraft encountered engine problems and the pilot decided to ditch the aircraft few miles offshore.
 Sep 2, 1978: A Grumman Goose on a flight from Christiansted to Charlotte Amalie, experienced engine failure, and the pilot (Charles F. Blair Jr.) attempted to ditch the aircraft but the during the ditching the aircraft crashed killing 4 including Charles F. Blair Jr.
 Jun 4, 1978: A Grumman Goose on a flight from Charlotte Amalie to Christiansted, experienced engine failure in the left engine. The pilot ditched the aircraft that thean struck rocks and came to rest on the shore. All 11 occupants escaped unharmed.
 Apr 5, 1978: A Grumman Goose crashed several minutes after takeoff from St John, when both engines shut down and the aircraft had to ditch in stormy conditions. All seven passengers were rescued whilst both pilots were killed on impact.
 Feb 21, 1976: A Grumman Goose crash on route to Christiansted from Charlotte Amalie, the right engine failed and the aircraft ditched. five passengers were killed and the rest were rescued.
 Jun 18, 1971: A Grumman Goose experienced double engine failure whilst on route to Fajardo. The aircraft ditched leaving nine people injured and killing two.
 Nov 14, 1970: A Consolidated PBY-5A Catalina experienced mechanical failure whilst on approach to the Christiansted seaplane base. The crew diverted to Christiansted-Alexander Hamilton Airport when, upon landing the gear collapsed bring the aircraft to rest. Neither pilot was injured.

References 

Defunct airlines of the United States Virgin Islands
1968 establishments in the United States Virgin Islands
Airlines disestablished in 1981